Evelyn Boscawen, 6th Viscount Falmouth (18 March 1819 – 6 November 1889), was a breeder of race horses and the winner of many classic races.

Personal life
His parents were the Reverend Hon John Evelyn Boscawen, Canon of Canterbury, (1790– 12 April 1851) and Catherine Elizabeth Annesley (died 30 July 1859). Boscawen was educated at Eton College and the University of Oxford and was called to the bar in 1841. On his marriage to Mary Frances Elizabeth Stapleton (24 March 1822 – 20 November 1891) on 29 July 1845, he acquired Mereworth Castle, near Maidstone, Kent. His wife was the 17th Baroness le Despencer. They had six children:-
 Hon Mary Elizabeth Frances Catherine (1846– 21 January 1916)
 Evelyn Edward Thomas (24 July 1847 – 1 October 1918)
 Hon Hugh le Despenser (28 February 1849 – 8 April 1908), married Lady Mary FitzWilliam daughter of the William Wentworth-Fitzwilliam, 6th Earl Fitzwilliam
 Hon Edith Maria (1851– 24 September 1906)
 Hon Mabel Emma (1855– 26 October 1927), married Charles H B Williams, of Bodelwyddan Castle, Denbighshire on 18 April 1882
 Hon John Richard de Clare (19 December 1860 – 12 December 1915)

On the death of his cousin, George Boscawen (8 July 1811 – 29 August 1852), he succeeded to the titles of Viscount and 6th Baron of Boscawen Rose, Cornwall. He also succeeded to the family seat of the Boscawens at Tregothnan.

Lord Falmouth died on 6 November 1889 and is buried at St Lawrence's Church, Mereworth.

Horse racing
In 1845 following his marriage, he had access to Mereworth Castle in Kent which became the site of a large and successful stud, breeding Thoroughbred horses, and winning many classic races. He originally used the pseudonym Mr Valentine when he first started to race horses; his horses were first trained by John Scott at Malton, North Yorkshire and when Scott died in 1871 he had them trained by Mathew Dawson at Newmarket. Fred Archer, an apprentice of Dawson's, became Lord Falmouth's retained jockey in 1874 following Archer's win in that years 2,000 Guineas. Archer is described by the National Horseracing Museum as ″... the best all-round jockey that the Turf has ever seen ...″, winning 2,748 races including 21 Classics – over half were for Lord Falmouth.

Lord Falmouth was first on the list of winning owners in 1877, 1878 and 1880, and finished second in 1879. His winnings for 1880 was £16,061 with Bal Gal winning eight races and contributing more than £10,000 in prize money. His success in the Classics was such that Lord Rosebery had a special form printed on which to send him congratulations. Lord Falmouth retired from racing in January 1884 and was presented with a silver shield by Mathew Dawson and Fred Archer. His race horses were sold by auction at Matthew Dawson's paddock at Newmarket on 28 April 1884. The total sum realised was 36,420 guineas at an average of 1,517 per horse. Busybody raised 8,800 guineas and Harvester raised 8,600, the latter sold to Sir John Willoughby. His breeding stud was sold on 30 June 1884.

Classic race victories
 Great Britain
 Epsom Derby winners – 1870: Kingcraft, 1877: Silvio
 1,000 Guineas winners – 1862: Hurricane, 1873: Cecilia, 1875: Spinaway, 1879: Wheel of Fortune
 2,000 Guineas winners – 1874: Atlantic, 1879: Charibert, 1883: Galliard
 Epsom Oaks winners – 1863: Queen Bertha, 1875: Spinaway, 1878: Jannette, 1880: Wheel of Fortune
 St. Leger winners – 1877: Silvio, 1878: Jannette, 1882: Dutch Oven

Some of his horses

 Atlantic
 Bal Gal – won eight races in 1880, accumulating more than £10,000 in prizemoney
 Busybody
 Cecilia
 Charibert – winner of the 2000 Guineas Stakes in 1879
 Childerie
 Dutch Oven
 Flax
 Gamos
 Harvester
 Hurricane – winner of 1,000 Guineas in 1862
 Jannette
 Kingcraft – winner of The Derby in 1870
 Lady Golightly
 Queen Bertha – winner of The Oaks in 1863 and dam (mother) of Wheel of Fortune.
 Silvio – winner of The Derby in 1877
 Spinaway
 Wheel of Fortune

The Falmouth Stakes was named in honour of Evelyn Boscawen and established in 1911. Originally restricted to three-year-old fillies it is now open to fillies and mares aged three years or older and run on the July Course at Newmarket over a distance of 1 mile (1,609 metres). It is scheduled to take place each year in July.

Tregothnan Botanical Gardens
The gardens are first recorded in 1695 by the traveller, Celia Fiennes, in her book Through England on a Side-Saddle, when she visited Hugh Boscawen, a relative through marriage. The present gardens were developed by Evelyn Boscawen and his brother the Honourable and Reverend John Townshend Boscawen, who was rector of the nearby parish of Lamorran.

See also

 Earl of Falmouth
 Viscount Falmouth

References

1819 births
1889 deaths
Evelyn
British racehorse owners and breeders
Cornish nobility
Owners of Epsom Derby winners
People educated at Eton College
Falmouth, Eveleyn Boscawen, 6th Viscount